The Eugeniusz Geppert Academy of Fine Arts in Wrocław is a public institution of higher learning established in 1946 originally as the College of Fine Arts. From 2008 the university bears the name of Polish master-painter Eugeniusz Geppert.

History
In January 1946, on the recommendation of Poland's Minister of Culture and Arts, Eugeniusz Geppert was entrusted with the task of establishing the Higher School of Fine Arts in the city of Wrocław which had been ravaged by war. Two buildings were chosen to house the school: the pre-war Municipal School of Crafts and Art Crafts (now located at ul. Traugutta) and former State Academy of Arts and Crafts.

Staff of the newly formed institutions was composed of painters such as Leon Dołżycki, Emil Krcha, Stanisław Pękalski, Maria Dawska; painter, graphic artist and designer Stanisław Dawski, glass designer Halina Jastrzębowska, interior and furniture designers Władysław Wincze and Marian Sigmund, as well as ceramists Julia Kotarbińska and Rudolf Krzywiec. The following years brought the faculty and school graduates many successes at national and international exhibitions and art competitions. In 1957 emerged the already-historical Theatre of the Senses (Teatr Sensybilistyczny) combining happening action of experimental theater with the performance art.

Since its inception the school bore the following names: College of Fine Arts (1946–1949), State College of Fine Arts (1949–1996), Academy of Fine Arts in Wrocław (1996–2008) and since 2008, the Eugeniusz Geppert Academy of Fine Arts.

Faculties
 Faculty of Painting and Sculpture
 Department of Painting
 Department of Sculpture
 Department of Art Education
 Faculty of Graphic Arts and Media
 Department of Graphic Arts
 Department of Media Arts
 Faculty of Interior Architecture and Design
 Department of Interior Design
 Department of Design
 Faculty of Ceramics and Glass
 Department of Design

List of rectors
 Eugeniusz Geppert: 1946–1950
 Mieczysław Pawełko: 1950–1952
 Stanisław Dawski: 1952–1965
 Stanisław Pękalski: 1965–1967
 Tadeusz Forowicz: 1967–1980
 Jan Jaromir Aleksiun: 1980–1982
 Rufin Kominek: 1982–1984
 Michał Jędrzejewski: 1984–1990
 Andrzej Klimczak-Dobrzański: 1990–1993
 Konrad Jarocki: 1993–1999
 Zbigniew Horbowy: 1999–2005
 Jacek Szewczyk: 2005–2012
 Piotr Kielan: 2012–2020
 Wojciech Pukocz: 2020–present

Notable alumni

 Maciej Cieśla (born 1988), contemporary painter
 Zbigniew Horbowy (1935–2019), glass artist
 Natalia LL  (1937–2022), painter, photographer and performance artist, a pioneer of feminist art in Poland
 Eugeniusz Molski (born 1942), artist, painter and sculptor
 Lech Rzewuski (1941–2004), painter
 Mira Żelechower-Aleksiun (born 1941), painter

Notes and references

External links 
 

Universities and colleges in Wrocław
Universities and colleges in Poland
Educational institutions established in 1946
1946 establishments in Poland